"I Should Care" is a popular song with music by Axel Stordahl and Paul Weston and lyrics by Sammy Cahn, published in 1944.  Cahn said that the title came to him by the time they played the first 4 bars.  It first appeared in the MGM film Thrill of a Romance. The original recording by Ralph Flanagan and His Orchestra, with vocalists: Harry Prime and The Singing Winds was made at Manhattan Center, New York City, on July 18, 1952. It was released by RCA Victor Records as catalog number 20-4885 (in USA) and by EMI on the His Master's Voice labels as catalog number B 10389.

The song has become a popular standard, and a jazz standard, with recordings by many artists.

Notable recordings
Frank Sinatra – 1945 recording with orchestra directed by Axel Stordahl (78 single B-side of "When Your Lover Has Gone")
Peggy Lee – 1945 transcription recording with Dave Barbour and His Orchestra
Harry James – 1946 recording live at Meadowbrook Gardens, CA (One Night Stand With Harry James, 1975, Joyce LP-1014)
Bud Powell – 1947 recording on The Bud Powell Trio (1951), Blues in the Closet (1956), Budism (1962), and Earl Bud Powell, Vol. 10 – Award at Birdland, 64 (1964)
Dizzy Gillespie and His Orchestra with Johnny Hartman – recorded 1949 (The Complete RCA Victor Recordings, 1995)
Ralph Flanagan and His Orchestra – single B-side c/w "Tippin' In" (1952)
Jeff Chandler – 45rpm single (1953)
June Christy (with Orchestra dir. by Pete Rugolo) – Something Cool (1954)
Julie London – Julie Is Her Name (1955)
Nat Adderley – Introducing Nat Adderley (1955)
Rita Reys – The Cool Voice of Rita Reys (1956)
Nat King Cole with Orchestra cond. by Billy May –  Just One of Those Things (1957)
Thelonious Monk – Thelonious Himself (1957), Solo Monk (1965)
Mel Tormé – Tormé (1958)
Stan Kenton – 1958 recording, At the Rendezvous: Vol. 2 (1989)
Johnny Hartman – And I Thought About You (1959)
The Four Freshmen – Love Lost (1959)
Kay Starr with Orchestra cond. by Van Alexander – Losers Weepers (1960)
Modern Jazz Quartet – Dedicated to Connie (1960)
Ann-Margret – And Here She Is (1961)
Timi Yuro – Hurt (1961)
Bill Evans Trio – How My Heart Sings! (1962), and on several concert recordings in 1965 and 1966 in Europe and in New York.
Gloria Lynne in 1964
Sammy Davis, Jr. – When the Feeling Hits You! (1965)
Sergio Franchi – There Goes My Heart (RCA Victor, 1967)
Mina – Dedicato a mio padre (1967)
Taco – After Eight (1982)
John Abercrombie – Solar (1984) 
Marian McPartland – Live at Maybeck Recital Hall, Volume Nine (1991)
Betty Carter - It's Not About the Melody (1992)
Joe Pass – 1992 recording, Unforgettable (1998)
Abbey Lincoln and Hank Jones – When There Is Love (1993)
Kenny Barron – Other Places (1993)
Barry Manilow – Singin' with the Big Bands (1994)
Jane Monheit – Taking a Chance on Love (2004)
Amy Winehouse – At the BBC (2012)

References

Literature
 I Should Care (Transcription). Jazz Research News 6
 Stephan Richter: The Beauty of Building, Dwelling, and Monk: Aesthetics, Religion, and the Architectural Qualities of Jazz. African American Review, Vol. 29, No. 2 (1995), S. 259–268

1944 songs
Songs with music by Axel Stordahl
Songs written by Paul Weston
Songs with lyrics by Sammy Cahn
Frank Sinatra songs
Barry Manilow songs
Frank Ifield songs
1940s jazz standards
Jazz compositions in C major
Pop standards